The Koma Kulshan Project is a 13.3 MW run-of-the-river hydroelectric generation facility on the slopes of Mount Baker, a stratovolcano in Washington state's North Cascades. The project commenced commercial operation in October 1990, and is owned by a Covanta Energy–Atlantic Power joint venture. It supplies Puget Sound Energy via a Power Supply Agreement (PSA) contract. Its single turbine is a Pelton wheel supplied by Sulzer Escher Wyss.

Located in the Mount Baker National Forest, it is one of six Federal Energy Regulatory Commission (FERC)-licensed small hydro installations on Federal Government land in Washington state.

Koma Kulshan is the name of Mount Baker in the Lummi dialect.

Dams
Intakes are located at diversion dams on the Rocky Creek and Sulphur Creek tributaries of Lake Shannon. Water is discharged from the powerhouse through a short run on Sandy Creek to Baker Lake.

Diversion of the creek affected the appearance of Upper and Middle Sulphur Creek Falls.

Peak generation

Power generation peaks in May through July coinciding with snowmelt, and has a smaller peak in November coinciding with the wet season.

References

Further reading

External links

FERC document library of documents related to permit 3239, Koma Kulshan
 — area topographic map

Hydroelectric power plants in Washington (state)
Buildings and structures in Whatcom County, Washington
Mount Baker-Snoqualmie National Forest
Energy infrastructure completed in 1990
Run-of-the-river power stations
1990 establishments in Washington (state)
Puget Sound Energy